Cephalacanthus is a genus of flowering plants belonging to the family Acanthaceae.

Its native range is Peru.

Species:
 Cephalacanthus maculatus Lindau

References

Acanthaceae
Acanthaceae genera